Timphan  or timpan is a steamed banana dumpling, a traditional kue specialty of Aceh, Indonesia. Ingredients to make timphan consists of glutinous rice flour, ground banana and coconut milk. All of this materials are then mixed and stirred until a thick as a dough. The banana-rice flour dough is spread lengthwise and then it filled with sweetened serikaya or grated coconut mixed with sugar. Then the dough is wrapped in banana leaves and steamed for an hour.

It is quite similar to another Indonesian favourite kue, nagasari. The difference is nagasari uses the slices of banana as fillings, while timphan is filled with sweet grated coconut instead, while banana is incorporated into its skin dough.

See also

 List of steamed foods

References 

Dumplings
Vegetarian dishes of Indonesia
Banana dishes
Kue
Steamed foods
Snack foods
Acehnese cuisine